Bolitochara is a genus of beetles belonging to the family Staphylinidae.

The genus was first described by Mannerheim in 1830.

The genus has almost cosmopolitan distribution.

Species:
 Bolitochara lucida
 Bolitochara mulsanti
 Bolitochara obliqua
 Bolitochara pulchra

References

Aleocharinae
Staphylinidae genera